Data processing is the collection and manipulation of data to produce meaningful information, especially by computers.

Data processing may also refer to:

Automatic Data Processing, a computer services company
Data analysis, the processing of data with the goal of highlighting, drawing conclusions, and supporting decision making
Data entry performed by a data entry clerk
Data processing system, a system which processes data which has been captured and encoded in a format style recognizable by the data processing system or has been created and stored by another unit of an information processing system
Electronic data processing, the use of automated methods to process data
Information and Software Technology, a scientific journal formerly published under the name Data Processing
Information processing, the change (processing) of information in any manner detectable by an observer
Unit record equipment, a class of machines that processed data before the advent of electronic computers

Data processing